The Financial Services Act 1986 (1986 c.60) was an Act of the Parliament of the United Kingdom passed by the government of Margaret Thatcher to regulate the financial services industry. The Act used a mixture of governmental regulation and self-regulation, and created a Securities and Investments Board (SIB) presiding over various new self-regulating organisations (SROs). It was superseded by the Financial Services and Markets Act 2000.

Context
The Act may be thought of as an “emasculated Gower”. Professor Laurence Gower had been asked to produce a report on financial regulation, followed by a draft bill. He tended towards a tighter and more top-heavy regime. The Thatcher government became impatient with this process and pushed a second bill through in place of Gower with more emphasis on self-regulation but containing most of the regulatory content of the Gower bill.

This relatively light approach to regulation followed a trend taking place in America under the Reagan administration.

Derivative products
Section 63 of the Act abolished any oversight of the courts on derivative contracts, which might otherwise have been considered speculative and thus contrary to the Gaming Act 1845. This exemption was not changed in the new Financial Services and Markets Act 2000.

Repeal
The Act was repealed on 1 December 2001 by The Financial Services and Markets Act 2000 (Consequential Amendments and Repeals) Order 2001 and was superseded by the Financial Services and Markets Act 2000. Under this, the SIB and SROs were merged to form the Financial Services Authority (FSA), and self-regulation took a back seat.

See also

Gower Report
Glass–Steagall Act of 1933
Depository Institutions Deregulation and Monetary Control Act of 1980
Garn–St. Germain Depository Institutions Act of 1982
Financial Services and Markets Act 2000
Financial Services Authority

Notes

References
 Rider, B., Chaikin, D. and Abrams, C. (1987). Guide to the Financial Service Act 1986. CCH Editions.

United Kingdom Acts of Parliament 1986
Financial regulation in the United Kingdom
Repealed United Kingdom Acts of Parliament
1986 in economics